Luisa Elena Contreras Mattera (1922–2006) was a Venezuelan aircraft pilot. On 1 July 1943, she received her pilot's license from the Escuela de Aviación Civil Miguel Rodríguez. She became the first woman to complete a solo flight in Venezuela.

See also
Ana Branger

References

1922 births
2006 deaths
People from Táchira
Venezuelan aviators
Women aviators
Venezuelan women aviators